Edmund Kenyan (died 1414), of Oxford, was an English politician and innkeeper.

Family
At some point between 137 1380, Kenyan married Elizabeth, the widow of John Norton of Oxford. Kenyan and Elizabeth had one daughter. At some point before 1411, he married a woman named Margaret. Nothing more is recorded of her and they appear not to have had children.

Career
He was a Member (MP) of the Parliament of England for Oxford in
1379, November 1380, 1381, May 1382, 1385, 1386, November 1390, 1391 and 1394. He was Mayor of Oxford in 1401–2, 1404–5, 1410–11 and 1412–13.

References

14th-century births
1414 deaths
English MPs 1379
English MPs November 1380
English MPs 1381
Mayors of Oxford
English MPs May 1382
English MPs 1385
English MPs 1386
English MPs November 1390
English MPs 1391
English MPs 1394